Takeno may refer to:

Takeno, Hyōgo, a former town in Kinosaki District, Hyōgo Prefecture, Japan
Takeno Station, a railway station in Toyooka, Hyōgo Prefecture, Japan

People with the surname
, Japanese basketball player
, Japanese tea master

Japanese-language surnames